Mama's Bad Boy is the second studio album by Master P, released on April 20, 1992 by No Limit Records and In-A-Minute Records.

Track listing

References

Master P albums
1992 albums
No Limit Records albums